Albert Frick (born 21 October 1948) is a Liechtensteiner politician, member of the Progressive Citizens' Party, and the current President of the Landtag of Liechtenstein since March 2013.

References 

1948 births
Speakers of the Landtag of Liechtenstein
Progressive Citizens' Party politicians
Members of the Landtag of Liechtenstein
Living people